The native form of this personal name is Hegedüs Éva. This article uses Western name order when mentioning individuals.

Éva Hegedüs (born in Eger, Hungary on September 13, 1957) is an economist, the Chairman-CEO and majority shareholder through E.P.M. Ltd. of Gránit Bank.

Since 2013, she has been a member of the Board of the Hungarian Banking Association, representing middle-sized and small banks. She has been General Secretary of the Magyar Közgazdasági Társaság (in English: Hungarian Economic Association) since 2014. In 2019 and in 2020, Forbes magazine recognised her as the most influential Hungarian businesswoman. Starting from June 15, 2019, she is the social chair of the Hungarian Water Polo Federation.

Career 
She graduated from the Budapest University of Economics with a major degree. Her first job was at the Ipargazdasági és Üzemszervezési Intézetben (in English: Institute of Industrial Economics and Business Administration), where she worked as a research fellow. Thereafter, her career continued in government institutions between 1981 and 1996. From 1993, she was Deputy Secretary of State in the Pénzügyminisztérium (in English: Ministry of Finance) and later even in the Gazdasági Minisztérium (in English: Ministry of Economy). She participated in the preparation of a number of Hungarian pieces of legislation, such as the Credit Institutions Act and the Bankruptcy Act. Later she joined the Földhitel- és Jelzálogbank (in English: Land Loan and Mortgage Bank) in 1997, where she became the Deputy Chief Executive Officer and organized the resumption of mortgage bond issuance in Hungary.

Between 2000 and 2002 she was the Deputy State Secretary for Strategic and Energy Affairs at the Gazdasági Minisztérium  (Ministry of Economy) and was responsible for the regulation of the liberalization of the Hungarian energy sector and the regulation of housing loans. From 2002 to 2006 she headed the retail division of the Országos Takarékpénztár és Kereskedelmi Bank Rt. (OTP) and she became the president of the Housing Savings of the OTP Bank as well.

At the request of Sándor Demján, she took over the management of Gránit Bank in 2010. She has become the CEO and the Vice President of the Board of Directors there. She has been a shareholder since the start, and became one of the largest private shareholders in 2015 following the share transaction concluded with Sándor Demján. The development of GRÁNIT Bank's digital business model is credited to Ms. Hegedüs. Under this model in July 2017, the bank, which primarily provides its services through electronic channels, launched a completely online account opening process using video identification.

She is currently a member of the Board of the “Magyar Közgazdasági Társaság Pénzügyi Szakosztály” (in English: Finance Section of the Hungarian Economic Association). In 2020, at the assembly for renewal of the term of office, Éva Hegedüs was appointed Secretary General of the Hungarian Economic Association for the third consecutive time.

In 2020, she was elected a member of the Board of the Hungarian Banking Association for the third time.

In 2020, she was re-elected social chairman of the Hungarian Water Polo Association for another term of four years.

Awards 

 In 2015, at the ‘MasterCard - Bank of the Year’ awards, Éva Hegedüs was elected as Banker of the Year by Hungarian bank managers.
 In 2016, Éva Hegedüs received the Female Manager of the Year award at the PWA Successful Women's Association Gala.
 In 2017, Mihály Varga, Minister of National Economy recognised her decades-long outstanding work in the financial and banking sectors by giving her the “Magyar Gazdaságért” (For the Hungarian Economy) Award.
 She has been included in Forbes’ list of the 50 Most Influential Women of Hungary four times; in 2019 and 2020, the magazine named her as The Most Influential Hungarian Businesswoman. In 2018, she ranked second and in 2017 third in the business category.
In 2020, she won the “Outstanding Volunteer for Financial Culture Development     Award” of Pénz7.
In July 2021, the Menedzserek Országos Szövetsége  awarded her the Manager of the Year 2020 Award.

Family 
Éva Hegedüs lives with her partner, she is the mother of two adult children.

References 

1957 births
Living people
People from Eger
Hungarian bankers
Hungarian women in business
Forbes people
Women economists
Women bankers
Corvinus University of Budapest alumni
20th-century Hungarian economists
20th-century Hungarian politicians
20th-century Hungarian women politicians
21st-century Hungarian economists
21st-century Hungarian politicians
21st-century Hungarian women politicians
21st-century Hungarian businesspeople
21st-century businesswomen